Alessandro De Angelis may refer to:
 Alessandro De Angelis (Jesuit)
 Alessandro De Angelis (astrophysicist)